Eupithecia burselongata is a moth in the family Geometridae. It is found in south-western China (Yunnan).

The wingspan is about 18–22 mm. The forewings are very pale buff and the hindwings are dingy white.

References

Moths described in 2004
burselongata
Moths of Asia